The Incheon International Airport Expressway (Korean: 인천국제공항고속도로, Incheon Gukje Gonghang Gosok Doro) is an expressway in South Korea connecting Incheon International Airport to Goyang, Gyeonggi.

History 
 December 1995: Construction Begin.
 20 November 2001: Opens to traffic.
 27 June 2013: Cheongra IC opens to traffic.

Composition

Lanes 
 6-8 Lanes

Length 
 36.55 km

Speed Limit 
 100 km/h

List of facilities 

IC: Interchange, JC: Junction, SA: Service Area, TG:Tollgate

Gallery

External links 
 MOLIT South Korean Government Transport Department

Expressways in South Korea
Incheon International Airport
Roads in Incheon
Roads in Gyeonggi
Roads in Seoul